Gossip Girl is the debut EP by the South Korean girl group Rainbow. It was released on November 12, 2009 with the song with same name as title track.

Background
DSP Media announced on November 4 they will debut a new 7-members girl group, called "Rainbow". On November 6, they released another teaser image of the girls and revealed their names, ages, respective colors and the name of their debut EP. On the same day, they released a screencap image of the music video for "Gossip Girl". During the debut time, they were called the "second KARA" due to both groups are signed on the same label. The music video for "Gossip Girl" was released on November 12, along with the EP release.

Promotion
The group debuted on November 14, on the MBC's show Music Core. They also promoted on the shows KBS's Music Bank, SBS's Inkigayo and Mnet's M! Countdown. They followed the promotions of the EP with the song "Not Your Girl" on January 16, 2010. The promotions ended on February 21, on the show Inkigayo.

Composition
The song "Gossip Girl" was produced by Hur Youn Won, "Not Your Girl" was produced by Han Sang Won and "Kiss" was composed by SS501's member Park Jung-min.

Track listing

Charts

Album chart

Single chart

Other charted songs

Sales

Release history

Notes

References

External links
 

2009 debut EPs
Dance-pop EPs
Korean-language EPs
Rainbow (girl group) EPs